Bambale Osby (born May 21, 1986) is an American professional basketball player. He played collegiate for New Mexico and Maryland.

College career

Professional career
In January 2013, he signed with Kolossos Rodou of Greece. In March 2014, he left Kolossos and signed with BC Šiauliai of Lithuania for the rest of the season.

For the 2014–15 season, he signed with Socar Petkim of the Turkish Basketball Second League. After the end of the Turkish season, he signed with his former team Aix-Maurienne Savoie.

References

External links
Maryland bio
FIBA.com profile
Eurobasket.com profile

1986 births
Living people
Afyonkarahisar Belediyespor players
Aix Maurienne Savoie Basket players
American expatriate basketball people in Argentina
American expatriate basketball people in Austria
American expatriate basketball people in Estonia
American expatriate basketball people in France
American expatriate basketball people in Greece
American expatriate basketball people in Israel
American expatriate basketball people in Lithuania
American expatriate basketball people in Romania
American expatriate basketball people in Turkey
American men's basketball players
Basketball players from Richmond, Virginia
BC Šiauliai players
BC Tallinn Kalev players
CS Universitatea Cluj-Napoca (men's basketball) players
Kolossos Rodou B.C. players
Korvpalli Meistriliiga players
La Unión basketball players
Maccabi Kiryat Motzkin basketball players
Maryland Terrapins men's basketball players
New Mexico Lobos men's basketball players
Orléans Loiret Basket players
Paris Dragons basketball players
Petkim Spor players
Power forwards (basketball)
Swans Gmunden players
TTÜ KK players
KB Ylli players